Cnemidophorus espeuti is a species of teiid lizard found on Isla de Providencia and San Andrés in Colombia.

References

espeuti
Reptiles described in 1885
Taxa named by George Albert Boulenger
Reptiles of Colombia